Lallement may refer to:

5447 Lallement, a main-belt asteroid
Pierre Lallement (1843–1891), French inventor